No. 7 Air Experience Flight (7 AEF) is one of thirteen  Air Experience Flights (AEFs) run by the Air Cadet Organisation of the Royal Air Force.  The primary purpose of the AEF organisation is to provide air experience to members of the Air Training Corps, Combined Cadet Force (RAF) Section and occasionally, the Girls Venture Corps Air Cadets and the Air Scouts.

History 
No. 7 AEF formed on 8 September 1958 at RAF Newton in Nottinghamshire, equipped with de Havilland Chipmunk T.10 aircraft.

It later moved to RAF Cranwell with the Grob Tutor T.1.

References

07